Darkness into Light is an annual walking event and fundraiser held, primarily, across the island of Ireland. Participants meet before dawn (4:15am) on a particular Saturday in May and walk or run for 5 km to meet the sunrise. Founded in 2009 by psychologist Joan Freeman as a fundraiser in the Phoenix Park for Pieta House suicide prevention and counselling, 400 attended the first event while the 2017 event was attended by an estimated 150,000 participants at more than 150 locations. Similar events occur in Australia and New Zealand, Asia and North America. The fundraising event has risen from 400 participants, at its inauguration in Dublin 2009, to over 200,000 throughout global 150 locations in 19 countries by 2018.

Pieta House 
The Darkness into Light event is a fundraiser for Pieta House which provides counseling to anyone struggling with suicide or for anyone impacted by suicide. Joan Freeman, an Irish psychologist and politician, founded Pieta House in 2006. Pieta House aims to support those who are in suicidal distress, engage in self-harm, and are bereaved by suicide. They offer free services with the goal to ensure accessibility and help to anyone in need. Despite the Covid-19 pandemic, Pieta House was still able to provide services to communities across Ireland, servicing over 52,000 hours of counseling as well as answering over 70,000 crisis support calls. Electric Ireland has sponsored Darkness into Light since 2013. They additionally help promote and raise awareness for the Pieta House.

Out of the Darkness Walk Fundraiser 
Out of the Darkness Walk is a similar event to the Darkness into Light fundraiser held in the United States. Beginning in 2004, It is a community walk that takes place in towns across the country. The American Foundation for Suicide Prevention created this event as a way for anyone impacted by suicide (survivors, family members, friends, communities) to come together. Similar to the Darkness into Light Walk, this event is a walking fundraiser where participants walk-side-by-side in support of one another. The goal of this event is to bring more awareness to mental health, fight suicide and also remember loved ones lost to suicide.

References

External links
 

Annual events in the Republic of Ireland
Events in Dublin (city)
Challenge walks
Mental health in Ireland
Running events
2009 establishments in Ireland
Spring (season) events in the Republic of Ireland